Delton is a neighbourhood located in north central Edmonton, Alberta, Canada.  It is named after Edmonton businessman and former alderman Edmund Del Grierson. An older area in Edmonton, some houses dating back to 1904. The neighbourhood is bounded on the north by the Yellowhead Trail, on the west by 97 Street, on the east by 86 Street, and on the south by 122 Avenue.

Surrounding neighbourhoods are Eastwood to the east and south east, Alberta Avenue to the south, and Westwood to the west.  North of Delton, on the far side of the Yellowhead corridor, is the neighbourhood of Killarney.

The community is represented by the Delton Community League, established in 1961, which maintains a community hall and outdoor rink located at 88 Street and 123 Avenue.

Demographics 

Incomes in Delton are lower than the city average.

See also 
 Edmonton Federation of Community Leagues

References 

Neighbourhoods in Edmonton